Bukovo is a rural locality (a village) in Pokrovskoye Rural Settlement, Velikoustyugsky District, Vologda Oblast, Russia. The population was 7 as of 2002.

Geography 
Bukovo is located 33 km southeast of Veliky Ustyug (the district's administrative centre) by road. Ilyinskoye is the nearest rural locality.

References 

Rural localities in Velikoustyugsky District